The 2002 South Carolina Gamecocks baseball team represents the University of South Carolina in the 2002 NCAA Division I baseball season. The Gamecocks played their home games at the new Sarge Frye Field. The team was coached by Ray Tanner in his 6th season at South Carolina.

The Gamecocks lost the College World Series, defeated by the Texas Longhorns in the championship game.

Roster

Schedule and results

! style="" | Regular Season (44–12)
|- valign="top"

|- align="center" bgcolor="#ddffdd"
| ||  || No. 8 || Sarge Frye Field • Columbia, SC || W 11–3 || 1–0 || –
|- align="center" bgcolor="#ddffdd"
| || Charleston Southern || No. 8 || Sarge Frye Field • Columbia, SC || W 19–1 || 2–0 || –
|- align="center" bgcolor="#ddffdd"
| || Charleston Southern || No. 8 || Sarge Frye Field • Columbia, SC || W 3–2 || 3–0 || –
|- align="center" bgcolor="#ddffdd"
| ||  || No. 5 || Sarge Frye Field • Columbia, SC || W 14–2 || 4–0 || –
|- align="center" bgcolor="#ddffdd"
| || East Tennessee State || No. 5 || Sarge Frye Field • Columbia, SC || W 7–4 || 5–0 || –
|- align="center" bgcolor="#ddffdd"
| || East Tennessee State || No. 5 || Sarge Frye Field • Columbia, SC || W 14–5 || 6–0 || –
|- align="center" bgcolor="#ddffdd"
| || vs.  || No. 5 || Coastal Federal Field • Myrtle Beach, SC || W 5–3 || 7–0 || –
|- align="center" bgcolor="#ddffdd"
| || vs. No. 17  || No. 5 || Coastal Federal Field • Myrtle Beach, SC || W 8–3 || 8–0 || –
|- align="center" bgcolor="#ddffdd"
| || vs.  || No. 5 || Coastal Federal Field • Myrtle Beach, SC || W 11–2 || 9–0 || –
|-

|- align="center" bgcolor="#ffdddd"
| || No. 3 Clemson || No. 4 || Sarge Frye Field • Columbia, SC || L 7–9 || 9–1 || –
|- align="center" bgcolor="#ffdddd"
| || at No. 3 Clemson || No. 4 || Beautiful Tiger Field • Clemson, SC || L 10–11 || 9–2 || –
|- align="center" bgcolor="#ddffdd"
| ||  || No. 4 || Sarge Frye Field • Columbia, SC || W 10–4 || 10–2 || –
|- align="center" bgcolor="#ddffdd"
| ||  || No. 4 || Sarge Frye Field • Columbia, SC || W 6–5 || 11–2 || –
|- align="center" bgcolor="#ddffdd"
| ||  || No. 4 || Sarge Frye Field • Columbia, SC || W 5–1 || 12–2 || –
|- align="center" bgcolor="#ddffdd"
| || Seton Hall || No. 4 || Sarge Frye Field • Columbia, SC || W 6–2 || 13–2 || –
|- align="center" bgcolor="#ddffdd"
| || Seton Hall || No. 4 || Sarge Frye Field • Columbia, SC || W 10–5 || 14–2 || –
|- align="center" bgcolor="#ddffdd"
| ||  || No. 4 || Sarge Frye Field • Columbia, SC || W 15–2 || 15–2 || –
|- align="center" bgcolor="#ddffdd"
| ||  || No. 4 || Sarge Frye Field • Columbia, SC || W 15–0 || 16–2 || –
|- align="center" bgcolor="#ffdddd"
| || at No. 23  || No. 4 || Dudy Noble Field • Starkville, MS || L 4–12 || 16–3 || 0–1
|- align="center" bgcolor="#ddffdd"
| || at No. 23 Mississippi State || No. 4 || Dudy Noble Field • Starkville, MS || W 5–3 || 17–3 || 1–1
|- align="center" bgcolor="#ddffdd"
| || at No. 23 Mississippi State || No. 4 || Dudy Noble Field • Starkville, MS || W 9–6 || 18–3 || 2–1
|- align="center" bgcolor="#ddffdd"
| ||  || No. 4 || Sarge Frye Field • Columbia, SC || W 15–6 || 19–3 || 2–1
|- align="center" bgcolor="#ddffdd"
| || No. 6 Florida || No. 4 || Sarge Frye Field • Columbia, SC || W 2–1 || 20–3 || 3–1
|- align="center" bgcolor="#ffdddd"
| || No. 6 Florida || No. 4 || Sarge Frye Field • Columbia, SC || L 5–14 || 20–4 || 3–2
|- align="center" bgcolor="#ddffdd"
| || No. 6 Florida || No. 4 || Sarge Frye Field • Columbia, SC || W 6–4 || 21–4 || 4–2
|- align="center" bgcolor="#ffdddd"
| || at The Citadel || No. 3 || Joseph P. Riley Jr. Park • Charleston, SC || L 1–5 || 21–5 || 4–2
|- align="center" bgcolor="#ffdddd"
| || No. 5  || No. 3 || Sarge Frye Field • Columbia, SC || L 6–10 || 21–6 || 4–3
|- align="center" bgcolor="#ddffdd"
| || No. 5 Alabama || No. 3 || Sarge Frye Field • Columbia, SC || W 9–6 || 22–6 || 5–3
|- align="center" bgcolor="#ddffdd"
| || No. 5 Alabama || No. 3 || Sarge Frye Field • Columbia, SC || W 4–3 || 23–6 || 6–3
|-

|- align="center" bgcolor="#ddffdd"
| || Wofford || No. 4 || Sarge Frye Field • Columbia, SC || W 11–0 || 24–6 || 6–3
|- align="center" bgcolor="#ffdddd"
| || at  || No. 4 || Baum–Walker Stadium • Fayetteville, AR || L 4–7 || 24–7 || 6–4
|- align="center" bgcolor="#ffdddd"
| || at Arkansas || No. 4 || Baum–Walker Stadium • Fayetteville, AR || L 7–8 || 24–8 || 6–5
|- align="center" bgcolor="#ddffdd"
| || The Citadel || No. 7 || Sarge Frye Field • Columbia, SC || W 2–0 || 25–8 || 6–5
|- align="center" bgcolor="#ddffdd"
| || at  || No. 7 || Hawkins Field • Nashville, TN || W 7–5 || 26–8 || 7–5
|- align="center" bgcolor="#ddffdd"
| || at Vanderbilt || No. 7 || Hawkins Field • Nashville, TN || W 10–1 || 27–8 || 8–5
|- align="center" bgcolor="#ddffdd"
| || at Vanderbilt || No. 7 || Hawkins Field • Nashville, TN || W 20–13 || 28–8 || 9–5
|- align="center" bgcolor="#ddffdd"
| || at No. 1 Clemson || No. 7 || Beautiful Tiger Field • Clemson, SC || W 8–6 || 29–8 || 9–5
|- align="center" bgcolor="#ffdddd"
| || No. 27  || No. 7 || Sarge Frye Field • Columbia, SC || L 8–9 || 29–9 || 9–6
|- align="center" bgcolor="#ddffdd"
| || No. 27 LSU || No. 7 || Sarge Frye Field • Columbia, SC || W 4–2 || 30–9 || 10–6
|- align="center" bgcolor="#ddffdd"
| || No. 27 LSU || No. 7 || Sarge Frye Field • Columbia, SC || W 4–3 || 31–9 || 11–6
|- align="center" bgcolor="#ffdddd"
| || No. 1 Clemson || No. 6 || Sarge Frye Field • Columbia, SC || L 1–4 || 31–10 || 11–6
|- align="center" bgcolor="#ddffdd"
| || at  || No. 6 || Cliff Hagan Stadium • Lexington, KY || W 6–4 || 32–10 || 12–6
|- align="center" bgcolor="#ddffdd"
| || at Kentucky || No. 6 || Cliff Hagan Stadium • Lexington, KY || W 6–4 || 33–10 || 13–6
|- align="center" bgcolor="#ddffdd"
| || at Kentucky || No. 6 || Cliff Hagan Stadium • Lexington, KY || W 12–6 || 34–10 || 14–6
|-

|- align="center" bgcolor="#ddffdd"
| || at Wofford || No. 4 || Duncan Park • Spartanburg, SC || W 5–4 || 35–10 || 14–6
|- align="center" bgcolor="#ddffdd"
| || No. 9  || No. 4 || Sarge Frye Field • Columbia, SC || W 17–12 || 36–10 || 15–6
|- align="center" bgcolor="#ddffdd"
| || No. 9 Ole Miss || No. 4 || Sarge Frye Field • Columbia, SC || W 6–4 || 37–10 || 16–6
|- align="center" bgcolor="#ffdddd"
| || No. 9 Ole Miss || No. 4 || Sarge Frye Field • Columbia, SC || L 2–4 || 37–11 || 16–7
|- align="center" bgcolor="#ddffdd"
| ||  || No. 5 || Sarge Frye Field • Columbia, SC || W 10–6 || 38–11 || 17–7
|- align="center" bgcolor="#ffdddd"
| || Tennessee || No. 5 || Sarge Frye Field • Columbia, SC || L 7–8 || 38–12 || 17–8
|- align="center" bgcolor="#ddffdd"
| || Tennessee || No. 5 || Sarge Frye Field • Columbia, SC || W 5–3 || 39–12 || 18–8
|- align="center" bgcolor="#ddffdd"
| || at Charleston Southern || No. 5 || CSU Ballpark • Charleston, SC || W 16–4 || 40–12 || 18–8
|- align="center" bgcolor="#ddffdd"
| || vs.  || No. 5 || CSU Ballpark • Charleston, SC || W 14–0 || 41–12 || 18–8
|- align="center" bgcolor="#ddffdd"
| ||  || No. 5 || Foley Field • Athens, GA || W 11–9 || 42–12 || 19–8
|- align="center" bgcolor="#ddffdd"
| || Georgia || No. 5 || Foley Field • Athens, GA || W 12–4 || 43–12 || 19–8
|- align="center" bgcolor="#ddffdd"
| || Georgia || No. 5 || Foley Field • Athens, GA || W 4–2 || 44–12 || 20–8
|- align="center" bgcolor="white"

|-
! style="" | Postseason (13–6)
|-

|- align="center" bgcolor="#ddffdd"
| || vs. (8) Arkansas || (1) No. 4 || Hoover Metropolitan Stadium • Hoover, AL || W 10–1 || 45–12 || 1–0
|- align="center" bgcolor="#ffdddd"
| || vs. (4) No. 10 LSU || (1) No. 4 || Hoover Metropolitan Stadium • Hoover, AL || L 2–8 || 45–13 || 1–1
|- align="center" bgcolor="#ddffdd"
| || vs. (8) Arkansas || (1) No. 4 || Hoover Metropolitan Stadium • Hoover, AL || W 6–2 || 46–13 || 2–1
|- align="center" bgcolor="#ddffdd"
| || vs. (4) No. 10 LSU || (1) No. 4 || Hoover Metropolitan Stadium • Hoover, AL || W 10–8 || 47–13 || 3–1
|- align="center" bgcolor="#ddffdd"
| || vs. (4) No. 10 LSU || (1) No. 4 || Hoover Metropolitan Stadium • Hoover, AL || W 5–4 || 48–13 || 4–1
|- align="center" bgcolor="#ffdddd"
| || vs. (2) No. 7 Alabama || (1) No. 4 || Hoover Metropolitan Stadium • Hoover, AL || L 2–6 || 48–14 || 4–2
|-

|- align="center" bgcolor="#ddffdd"
| || (4) VCU || (1) No. 5 || Sarge Frye Field • Columbia, SC || W 6–3 || 49–14 || 1–0
|- align="center" bgcolor="#ddffdd"
| || (2) No. 14  || (1) No. 5 || Sarge Frye Field • Columbia, SC || W 9–6 || 50–14 || 2–0
|- align="center" bgcolor="#ffdddd"
| || (2) No. 14 North Carolina || (1) No. 5 || Sarge Frye Field • Columbia, SC || L 4–8 || 50–15 || 2–1
|- align="center" bgcolor="#ddffdd"
| || (2) No. 14 North Carolina || (1) No. 5 || Sarge Frye Field • Columbia, SC || W 3–1 || 51–15 || 3–1
|-

|- align="center" bgcolor="#ddffdd"
| || No. 17  || (6) No. 4 || Sarge Frye Field • Columbia, SC || W 10–7 || 52–15 || 4–1
|- align="center" bgcolor="#ffdddd"
| || No. 17 Miami (FL) || (6) No. 4 || Sarge Frye Field • Columbia, SC || L 2–5 || 52–16 || 4–2
|- align="center" bgcolor="#ddffdd"
| || No. 17 Miami (FL) || (6) No. 4 || Sarge Frye Field • Columbia, SC || W 6–4 || 53–16 || 5–2
|-

|- align="center" bgcolor="#ffdddd"
| || vs. No. 6  || (6) No. 3 || Rosenblatt Stadium • Omaha, NE || L 0–11 || 53–17 || 0–1
|- align="center" bgcolor="#ddffdd"
| || vs. No. 7 Nebraska || (6) No. 3 || Rosenblatt Stadium • Omaha, NE || W 10–8 || 54–17 || 1–1
|- align="center" bgcolor="#ddffdd"
| || vs. No. 6 Georgia Tech || (6) No. 3 || Rosenblatt Stadium • Omaha, NE || W 9–5 || 55–17 || 2–1
|- align="center" bgcolor="#ddffdd"
| || vs. (2) No. 4 Clemson || (6) No. 3 || Rosenblatt Stadium • Omaha, NE || W 12–4 || 56–17 || 3–1
|- align="center" bgcolor="#ddffdd"
| || vs. (2) No. 4 Clemson || (6) No. 3 || Rosenblatt Stadium • Omaha, NE || W 10–2 || 57–17 || 4–1
|- align="center" bgcolor="#ffdddd"
| || vs. (5) No. 2 Texas || (6) No. 3 || Rosenblatt Stadium • Omaha, NE || L 6–12 || 57–18 || 4–2
|- align="center" bgcolor="white"

| Schedule Source:

Awards and honors 
Justin Harris
All Tournament Team

Landon Powell
All Tournament Team

Gamecocks in the 2002 MLB Draft
The following members of the South Carolina Gamecocks baseball program were drafted in the 2002 Major League Baseball Draft.

References

South Carolina
South Carolina Gamecocks baseball seasons
South Carolina Gamecocks baseball
College World Series seasons
South Carolina